Ashmyany District is a district in Grodno Region of Belarus.

The administrative center is Ashmyany.

Notable residents 

 Jazep Hermanovich (1890, Halshany - 1978), Belarusian Eastern Catholic priest, writer, poet and Gulag survivor
 Zygmunt Mineyko (1840, Zialony Bor – 1925), a leading figure of the January Uprising on the territory of Belarus 
 Janka Viarsocki (in Belarusian Янка Вярсоцкі)(1888, Halshany - 1937), Belarusian religious and political activist of the early 20th century, victim of the Soviet repressions

References

 
Districts of Grodno Region